Weng Wenhao (26 July 1889 – 27 January 1971) was a Chinese geologist and politician. He was one of the earliest modern Chinese geologists, and is regarded as the founder of modern Chinese geology and the father of modern Chinese oil industry. From May to November 1948, Weng served as President of the Executive Yuan (Premier) of the Republic of China.

Life

Early years

He was born in 1889 in Cixi, Zhejiang in late Qing dynasty, and his courtesy name was Yongni (咏霓). His father was a local businessman.

In 1902, he earned the xiucai degree in the Imperial Examination at the age of only 13 He later studied at a French Catholic school in Shanghai.

He obtained his Doctor's degree on geology from the Catholic University of Leuven, Belgium, in 1912. He was the first Chinese person to hold a western Doctor's degree in geology.

ROC period
After returning to China in 1912, Weng served as Minister of Mine Industry and Minister of Agriculture and Commerce, in the Beiyang Government. He was a professor (and director from 1914) of the National Research Institute of Geography. Together with Ding Wenjiang, he founded the new National Geological Survey.

He was also a professor of geology in both Beijing University and Tsinghua University. He once was the head of the Department of Geography, Tsinghua University. In July 1931, he was appointed acting president of Tsinghua University.

In 1928, he assisted Canadian paleoanthropologist Davidson Black in the establishment of the Cenozoic Research Laboratory for the research and appraisal of Peking Man fossils unearthed at Zhoukoudian.

During the period of Central (Provisional) Military Government of the Republic of China, he served in the central government as the General Secretary of the Executive Yuan (13 December 1935 – 9 September 1937); the Minister of Industry (until 1 January 1938), Minister of Education (28 October 1932 – 21 April 1933), and the Minister of Economy (1 January 1938 – 1947).

Invited by Chiang Kai-shek, he served as the first president of the Executive Yuan of Nationalist Government (capital Nanjing) (25 May 1948 – 26 November 1948).

In March 1948, he was elected a founding member of Academia Sinica.

People's Republic of China 

After the Chinese Civil War, he moved to Beijing and served in the Chinese People's Political Consultative Conference (CPPCC) with his longtime associate Qian Changzhao.

During the Cultural Revolution, he was specially protected by Zhou Enlai. In 1971, he died in Beijing.

Academic achievements & activities
 One of the founders of modern Chinese geography;
 Set up modern Chinese oil industry;
 Studies of the Peking Man;
 Studies of earthquake in China.

Family
He had four sons, the eldest one named  (翁心源), was a famous petroleum engineer who was killed in Cultural Revolution, the second oldest one named  (翁心翰) was a Chinese Air Force pilot, and veteran of the Battle of Sichuan, who was killed later in the Second Sino-Japanese War/WWII.

The founder of Chinese modern geophysics -  (翁文波), an academician of the Chinese Academy of Sciences, is his cousin.

 (翁心植), academician of Chinese Academy of Engineering, is his nephew.

Major works
 Studies of Earthquakes in Gansu Procince (《甘肃地震考》)
 A Brief Record of Minerals in China (《中国矿产志略》)
 Literary Collection of Zhuizhi (《椎指集》)
 Mourn for Mr. Ding Zai-Jun (《追悼丁在君先生》)
 Earthquake (《地震》)
 Quadrumana Fossils in China (《中国灵长类动物化石》)
 The First Record on Chinese Mine Industry (《第一次中国矿业纪要》)
 Paleozoic Plant Fossils in the Middle Part of Shanxi Province (《山西中部古生代植物化石》)
 An Elementary Introduction to Earthquake (《地震浅说》)
 Lectures on Geology (《地质学讲义》)

Further reading

 Chronicle of Weng Wenhao, (《翁文灏年谱》), Oct. 2005
 Weng Wenhao's Outstanding Contributions to Chinese Oil Industry, (《翁文灏的石油业绩》)
 Selected Works of Weng Wenhao (《翁文灏选集》)
 Fiskesjö, Magnus and Chen Xingcan. _China Before China: Johan Gunnar Andersson, Ding Wenjiang, and the Discovery of China's Prehistory / 中国之前的中国:安特生,丁文江,和中国史前史的发现_. Bilingual edition, in English and Chinese. Stockholm: MFEA monographs no. 15, 2004. .  
 Fiskesjö, Magnus. "Science across borders: Johan Gunnar Andersson and Ding Wenjiang." In: Stevan Harrell, Charles McKhann, Margaret Swain and Denise M. Glover, eds., _Explorers and Scientists in China's Borderlands, 1880-1950_. Seattle: University of Washington Press, 2011, pp. 240–66. .  
 Shen, Grace Yen. _Unearthing the Nation: Modern Geology and Nationalism in Republican China._ Chicago: University of Chicago Press, 2014.

References

Bibliography

 徐 (Xú), 露梅 (Lùméi). 隕落 (Fallen): 682位空军英烈的生死档案 - 抗战空军英烈档案大解密 (A Decryption of 682 Air Force Heroes of The War of Resistance-WWII and Their Martyrdom). 东城区, 北京， 中国: 团结出版社, 2016. .

1889 births
1971 deaths
20th-century Chinese heads of government
Catholic University of Leuven (1834–1968) alumni
20th-century Chinese geologists
Economic Affairs Ministers of the Republic of China
Educators from Ningbo
Academic staff of Fu Jen Catholic University
Members of Academia Sinica
People's Republic of China politicians from Zhejiang
Politicians from Ningbo
Premiers of the Republic of China
Republic of China politicians from Zhejiang
Scientists from Ningbo